What Made Milwaukee Famous (WMMF) is an American indie rock band from Austin, Texas, United States.

In 2005, the band performed for Austin City Limits with Franz Ferdinand, making them one of the only unsigned bands to play for the show in its -year history.  In 2006, the band signed with Barsuk Records, which re-released their 2004 debut album, Trying to Never Catch Up. Their second album, What Doesn't Kill Us, was released on March 4, 2008. The band released their third album You Can't Fall Off the Floor on January 22, 2013.

Since forming, the band has played at the South by Southwest music festival, the Austin City Limits Festival, and Lollapalooza. They have opened for the Smashing Pumpkins, Arcade Fire, the Black Keys, and Snow Patrol. The band has been featured on in Billboard and Rolling Stone bands-to-watch lists.

After promoting You Can't Fall Off the Floor in 2013 and 2014, the band became largely inactive.

On June 12, 2019, the band announced a set of reunion shows in September 2019, scheduled in Austin and Houston. The three tour dates coincide with a release of a newly remastered 180-gram vinyl of their debut album Trying to Never Catch Up to celebrate the 15-year anniversary of its original release.

Name origin
The band's name is derived from Jerry Lee Lewis's song "What's Made Milwaukee Famous (Has Made a Loser Out of Me)".

Discography
 Trying to Never Catch Up - Barsuk Records (2006)
 The Sugarhill Sessions EP - Barsuk Records (2008)
 What Doesn't Kill Us - Barsuk Records (2008)
 You Can't Fall Off the Floor - Self-released (2013)

Reviews
 kMNR CD Review of Trying to Never Catch Up by Chris Andrade on September 20, 2006
 CD Review of Trying to Never Catch Up (mistakenly referred to as Trying Not to Catch Up) by MC Beastie for Soundsect.com
What Doesn't Kill Us Review on IGN by Chad Grischow on March 7, 2008
 CD Review of 'What Doesn't Kill Us' by Ashley Marie Sansotta on Mon Mar 17th, 2008

References

External links
Official site
What Made Milwaukee Famous on Barsuk.com
What Made Milwaukee Famous live on The Current
What Made Milwaukee Famous MySpace Page
What Made Milwaukee Famous and Sterogum
What Made Milwaukee Famous in studio performance

2002 establishments in Texas
Indie rock musical groups from Texas
Musical groups established in 2002
Musical groups from Austin, Texas
Barsuk Records artists